Lust is the third album by Ambitious Lovers. It was released in 1991 through Elektra Records. It was the band's final album.

The band's cover of Jorge Ben's "Umbabarauma" was a minor dance hit.

Production
The album was produced by band member Peter Scherer.

Critical reception
Trouser Press wrote that "Lust has enough of that unique Lindsay guitar squeal to keep the old-timers interested, but traditionalists might be disappointed that Arto’s turning into an out-and-out crooner — and a damn good one at that." The New York Times thought that the album "works with the idea that the subversion of mass-market tastes can be achieved by slipping in noise, odd sounds and other things under a shiny, pop veneer." The Spin Alternative Record Guide wrote that it oozes "sensual, hypnotic funk and samba."

Track listing

Personnel 
Ambitious Lovers
Arto Lindsay – vocals, guitar
Peter Scherer – keyboards, synthesizer bass, sampling, production
Additional musicians
D.K. Dyson – backing vocals
Melvin Gibbs – bass guitar
Tony Lewis – drums
Marc Ribot – guitar
Naná Vasconcelos – percussion
Production
Paul Angelli – assistant engineering
Scott Ansell – additional recording
Josef Astor – photography
Jason Baker – recording
Patrick Dillett – assistant engineering
Bil Emmons – assistant engineering
Masashi Kuwamoto – photography
Anthony Lee – art direction
Bob Ludwig – mastering
Francis Manzella – additional recording
Katherine Miller – assistant engineering
Roger Moutenot – mixing, assistant recording
David Schiffman – assistant engineering
Norika Sora – illustrations
Tomoyo Tanaka – art direction

References

External links 
 

1991 albums
Ambitious Lovers albums
Elektra Records albums